The First Saudi–Hashemite War, also known as the First Nejd–Hejaz War or the al-Khurma dispute, took place in 1918–19 between Abdulaziz Ibn Saud of the Emirate of Nejd and Hasa and the Hashemites of the Kingdom of Hejaz.

The war came within the scope of the historic conflict between the Hashemites of Hejaz and the Saudis of Riyadh (Nejd) over supremacy in Arabia. It resulted in the defeat of the Hashemite forces and capture of al-Khurma by the Saudis and his allied Ikhwan, but British intervention prevented immediate collapse of the Hashemite kingdom, establishing a sensitive cease-fire that would last until 1924.

Background
When World War I began, Ibn Saud, the powerful Emir of Nejd, offered the Hashemite ruler Sharif Husayn ibn Ali and the leaders of Ha'il and Kuwait to adopt a neutral stance in the conflict, avoiding intervention in European-related matters, and seeking self-determination for the Arab people. However, with no interests coinciding, no agreement had been reached. Ibn Saud ignored involvement on any side for the first two years of war, while Sharif Husayn of Hejaz began promoting the Arab Revolt against the Ottoman Empire, proclaiming himself "King of the Arabs." Ibn Saud was infuriated over the Sharifians' claim to the entire Arab peninsula and demanded negotiations to consider the borders of Nejd and Hejaz. Husayn rejected Saudi demands and insulted the Saudi ruler, which eventually brought Ibn Saud to become involved in the political crisis over al-Khurma oasis.

Warfare

First clashes (1918)
Ibn Saud himself however did not maintain neutrality through World War I, being generously supported by the British against the pro-Ottoman emirate of Ha'il. In December 1917, a British deputation, led by Colonel Hemilton tried to convince the Saudi leader to take action against the Ha'il emirate of Jabal Shammar. This attempt was unneeded as the Shammar rulers were already hostile and at war with Alsaud since Ibn Saud capture of Riyadh. In return for active campaigning effectively, Ibn Saud demanded firearms, Ibn Saud sought to recapture the Hail under Saudi control like previous Saudi states and get revenge for his father's exile. The British gave him the opportunity. Yet, the British advancement in the Ottoman province of Palestine made the Saudis less relevant, while the Hashemite leader in turn concluded a peace agreement with Jabal Shammar. Thus, in fall of 1918, when Ibn Saud organized some 5,000 men against Jabal Shammar, a British demand to cease military activities came in.

Al-Khurma, a crucial strategic oasis on the way between Nejd and Hejaz, had been under Hashemite rule, but following the dispute between the Saudis and the Hashemites, Khurma's emir Khalid ibn Mansur ibn Luwai defected to the Saudi side. In July 1918, after the defection of al-Khurma's emir, a detachment was dispatched by Hashemite King to seize al-Khurma. In response, Ibn Saud sent his Ikhwan forces to protect the oasis, defeating the Hashemites from Mecca.

Negotiations
Following the end of World War I, Sharif Husayn sought to strike a deal with Ibn Saud over the al-Khurma oasis. The conflict at that point expanded from a political dispute into a religious sectarian dimension, with the Wahhabis of Nejd standing against the orthodox Sunni Hashemites. Sharif Husayn decided on another expedition to Khurma. Though aware of the coming dispute, the British turned a blind eye to the Hashemite advances, largely underestimating the strength of the Saudis, who the British thought would be quickly overran.

Battle of Turaba
In May 1919, a Hashemite army, led by Abdallah ibn Husayn, was dispatched towards Turaba, an oasis some 80 miles away from Khurma. Turaba was seized and plundered on May 21. Ibn Saud dispatched a warning to the Hashemites, that their presence in Turaba or advance on Khurma would provoke a war, but neither side was willing to compromise at that time.

An Ikhwan force, under the command of Sultan bin Bajad, Hamud ibn Umar and Khalid meanwhile advanced on Turaba, and attacked the Hashemites by surprise on May 25–26 in their camp. In a few hours an entire Hashemite army was annihilated, with hundreds killed and thousands escaping in disarray. Abdallah ibn Husayn himself had barely fled the battlefield.

Saudi preparations to conquer Hejaz
The battle of Turaba was a turning point in the conflict, placing Sharif Husayn in a very weak position against Ibn Saud. In early July 1919, Ibn Saud himself arrived to Turaba with an army of 10,000 men, ready to advance on Hejaz. On July 4, however, a British ultimatum arrived to the Saudis, demanding to stop the campaign and return the Nejd. Unwilling to face the British, Ibn Saud submitted to the British demand and capitulated. It however could not change the notion of the Saudi ruler that the victory over Hejaz is possible.

Aftermath

In the next 4 years, the Saudi ruler was preoccupied with consolidation of his domain, undertaking several campaigns in new regions of Arabia, while keeping the Hejazi frontier quiet. Jabal Shammar was annexed in 1920–21, while Kuwait was defeated in 1922, defining the border with Iraq and Transjordan through the Uqair protocol of 1922, while simultaneously conquering Asir in south Arabia. By early 1923, Ibn Saud decided to take over Hejaz, but was unsure over British position. The worsening relations between England and Hashemite rulers and the proclamation of Sharif Husayn as Caliph, finally made Ibn Saud to undertake the campaign, entusiasthically supported by the religiously insighted Ikhwan, who had hoped to take over the holy sites of Islam. The preliminary attack on Taif came in September 1924, beginning the Saudi conquest, which would be complete in December 1925.

Casualties
The number of fatalities in the 1918–19 war was hundreds of killed and thousands of injured. The actual total number of fatalities is estimated at least 1,392.

See also
 History of Saudi Arabia
 List of modern conflicts in the Middle East

References

Wars involving Saudi Arabia
History of the Middle East
Conflicts in 1918
Conflicts in 1919